Perfect Darkness is the fifth studio album from British musician Fink, and the fourth to be recorded with his self-titled band. It was released on 13 June 2011 on Ninja Tune.

Background
The album was recorded in the space of 20 days with the intention of capturing a "sense of right nowness" and an "organic sounding recording". The title was chosen because it sounded "really first-tracky" to the band. Behind the title is also a deliberate misinterpretation of the genre of folk, and the album is described by Greenall not to be "a collection of songs about being dumped or ships leaving meadows or whatever it is people think folk's supposed to be nowadays, [it] is not that at all."

The album was produced by Billy Bush (who has worked with artists such as Beck and Garbage) and recorded in Brighton and Los Angeles.

Critical reception
Perfect Darkness was met with "generally favorable" reviews from critics. At Metacritic, which assigns a weighted average rating out of 100 to reviews from mainstream publications, this release received an average score of 69 based on 7 reviews.

In a review for The Guardian, critic reviewer Caroline Sullivan wrote: "His [Fink] fifth album often achieves such loveliness you don't want it to end. An organic warmth prevails on even the most emotionally chaotic songs – delicate fingerpicking and squeaking guitar strings sweeten the scathing "Honesty", while his hungover rasp on "Berlin Sunrise" paints an oddly seductive picture of the new day."

Track listing

Personnel

Fink
 Fin Greenall – vocals, acoustic guitars, sound effects ("FX")
 Guy Whittaker – electric and acoustic bass
 Tim Thornton – drums, electric and acoustic guitars

Additional personnel
 Matt Kelly – string arrangement (on "Perfect Darkness")
 Michael Flury – trombone (on "Save It for Somebody Else")
 Shane Beales – electric keyboard (on "Foot in the Door")

Production
 Billy Bush – producer
 Emily Lazar – mastering
 Joe LaPorta – mastering

Chart performance

Release history

References

2011 albums
Fink (singer) albums
Ninja Tune albums